Rear Admiral Charles Carroll Carpenter (February 27, 1834 – April 1, 1899) was an officer in the United States Navy. He participated in the African Slave Trade Patrol, fought in the American Civil War, served as commander of the Asiatic Squadron, and was recalled to duty briefly during the Spanish–American War.

Naval career
Carpenter was born in Leyden, Massachusetts, on February 27, 1834, the son of David N. Carpenter and the former Maria P. Newcomb. Appointed a midshipman from Massachusetts on October 1, 1850, he was attached to the sloop-of-war  in the Pacific Squadron from 1851 to 1855. He attended the United States Naval Academy in Annapolis, Maryland, from 1855 to 1856 and, upon completing his studies, was promoted to passed midshipman on June 20, 1856.

He was promoted to lieutenant on January 23, 1858.

Carpenter's next duty was aboard a receiving ship at Boston, Massachusetts, in 1858 and 1859, and he was promoted to master on January 22, 1858, and to lieutenant the next day. He reported for duty aboard the screw steamer  in 1859. Mohawk cruised off the coast of Cuba in 1859 and 1860 and captured the slave ship Wildfire on April 20, 1860, freeing 530 African slaves. She later guarded Naval Station Key West, in Key West, Florida, from armed groups seeking to seize it from the United States Government in the months prior to the outbreak of the American Civil War.

Civil War
Carpenter was still aboard Mohawk when the Civil War broke out in April 1861. He served aboard her that year in the Gulf of Mexico in the Union blockade of the Confederate States of America, both off Texas and in the East Gulf Blockading Squadron. In 1862 he was aboard the screw steamer  in the South Atlantic Blockading Squadron, participating in the capture of two blockade runners, the steamers Anglia and Emily, and being promoted to lieutenant commander on July 16, 1862. In 1863 he transferred to the monitor , also in the South Atlantic Blockading Squadron, and participated in attacks on the Confederate defenses of Charleston, South Carolina, on April 7, July 10, and August 17, 1863. Later in 1863 he was assigned to the staff of the U.S. Naval Academy, where he remained through the end of the war in 1865.

Post–Civil War
After service aboard the flagship of the Asiatic Squadron, the screw sloop-of-war , from 1866 to 1867, Carpenter became commanding officer of the screw sloop-of-war  in the same squadron in 1868. He then performed duty at the Portsmouth Navy Yard in Kittery, Maine, from 1868 to 1870 and was promoted to commander on February 10, 1869. After another short assignment at the Portsmouth Navy Yard in 1871, he returned to sea as commanding officer of the screw steamer  in the North Atlantic Squadron from 1871 to 1872. He was back at the Portsmouth Navy Yard from 1872 to 1875 on equipment duty.

Carpenter was commanding officer of the gunboat  in the North Atlantic Squadron from 1875 to 1876, before another tour at the Portsmouth Navy Yard in 1878. Promoted to captain on March 25, 1880, Carpenter was on equipment duty at the Boston Navy Yard in Boston, Massachusetts, from 1880 to 1882, then returned to USS Hartford as her commanding officer from 1882 to 1884; during his tour, Hartford carried a team of American and British scientists from Callao, Peru, to the Caroline Islands in the Pacific Ocean to observe the total solar eclipse of May 6, 1883. He commanded the receiving ship  at the Boston Navy Yard from 1888 to June 1890
.

Carpenter was commandant of the Portsmouth Navy Yard from June 1890 to January 15, 1894, and was promoted to commodore on May 15, 1893. He became commander of the Asiatic Squadron on September 1, 1894, and was promoted to rear admiral on November 11, 1894; the First Sino-Japanese War was a major concern of his tour as squadron commander.

Retirement
Carpenter relinquished command of the Asiatic Squadron on December 21, 1895, and retired from the Navy upon reaching the mandatory retirement age of 62 on February 28, 1896. He resided in Portsmouth, New Hampshire, during his retirement.

Recall to active duty
Carpenter was recalled to active duty during the Spanish–American War of 1898, returning to the Portsmouth Navy Yard to serve as its commandant from April to August 1898. He then returned to retirement.

Death
Carpenter had begun to suffer from severe nervous disorders during the final years of his naval career and sought medical treatment soon after his retirement. His condition improved, but around mid-February 1899 his health went into decline again, and he spent six weeks in the Adams Nervine Asylum in the Jamaica Plain neighborhood of Boston, Massachusetts, for treatment. Although his condition again showed signs of improvement, he committed suicide at the asylum by shooting himself in the head on the morning of April 1, 1899. He was survived by his wife, three sons, and two daughters.

Carpenter is buried at Proprietors Burying Ground in Portsmouth, New Hampshire.

See also

List of people from Massachusetts
List of people with surname Carpenter

Notes

References
Naval History and Heritage Command: Officers of the Continental and U.S. Navy and Marine Corps, 1775-1900.
Hamersly, Lewis Randolph. The Records of Living Officers of the U.S. Navy and Marine Corps, Fifth Edition, Philadelphia: L. R. Hamersly & Company, 1894.
History of Jamaica Plain (Suffolk County), Massachusetts: Charles C. Carpenter Biographical Sketch
Find-A-Grave Memorial: Lieut Charles Carroll Carpenter (1834–1899)
Anonymous. "Naval Officer's Suicide: Rear Admiral Carpenter Takes His Own Life at Boston," The New York Times, April 3, 1899.

External links
mainmemory.net Photograph of Charles C. Carpenter as Commandant of Portsmouth Navy Yard, Kittery, Maine, in 1898.

1834 births
1899 deaths
People from Leyden, Massachusetts
People from Portsmouth, New Hampshire
United States Navy rear admirals (upper half)
United States Naval Academy alumni
United States Naval Academy faculty
Union Navy officers
People of Massachusetts in the American Civil War
United States Navy personnel of the Spanish–American War
American military personnel who committed suicide
Suicides by firearm in Massachusetts
Burials in New Hampshire
1890s suicides